= Benjamin Esty =

American economist

Benjamin C. Esty is an American economist currently the Roy and Elizabeth Simmons Professor of Business Administration at Harvard Business School.

Esty is a prolific writer of case studies and is recognised among the top 40 case authors consistently, since the list was first published in 2016 by The Case Centre. He ranked 18th In 2018/19, 10th in 2017/18, 15th in 2016/17 and 17th in 2015/16.

He also featured on the list of The Case Centre's all-time top authors list (covering 40 years) released in 2014.
